Nong Prue Stadium or formally Nongprue Municipality Stadium is a stadium in Pattaya, Chonburi, Thailand. The stadium was opened in 1999 and holds a capacity of 5,500 spectators is currently used for football matches and is the home stadium of Pattaya United of the Thai League 1.

Photos

See also
 Nong Prue 2 Stadium

External links
Stadium information

References

Football venues in Thailand
Rugby union stadiums in Asia
Buildings and structures in Chonburi province
Sport in Chonburi province